Luan Martins Pereira (born 21 April 2000), commonly known as Luanzinho or simply Luan, is a Brazilian footballer who plays as an attacking midfielder for Sharjah .

Club career
Born in Ariquemes, Rondônia, Luanzinho joined Avaí's youth setup in August 2014. In July 2017, he was promoted to the main squad by manager Claudinei Oliveira.

On 3 August 2017, Luanzinho made his first team – and Série A – debut, coming on as a second-half substitute for Wellington Simião in a 0–5 away loss against Atlético Paranaense. In September, he extended his contract until 2021.

Personal life
His father Edson Pereira was a Vilhena former footballer, while his brother Renan was also a footballer and a midfielder; the latter was also groomed at Avaí, but died from a brain tumor in 2017.

Career statistics

Honours
Avaí
Campeonato Catarinense: 2019

References

External links
 

2000 births
Living people
Sportspeople from Rondônia
Brazilian footballers
Brazilian expatriate footballers
Association football midfielders
Campeonato Brasileiro Série A players
Campeonato Brasileiro Série B players
Avaí FC players
Sharjah FC players
UAE Pro League players
Brazil youth international footballers
Expatriate footballers in the United Arab Emirates
Brazilian expatriate sportspeople in the United Arab Emirates